LDY could refer to:
 City of Derry Airport, Northern Ireland, IATA airport code
 County Londonderry, Northern Ireland, Chapman code
 Ladybank railway station, Fife, (Scotland); National Rail station code
 Leicestershire and Derbyshire Yeomanry; Former British Army Regiment

fr:LDY